The 1955–56 Tercera División season was the 20th since its establishment.

League table

Group 1

Regular season

Permanence Phase

Group 2

Regular season

Permanence Phase

Group 3

Group 4

Group 5

Group 6

Group 7

Group 8

Mallorca

Menorca

Play-offs

Tiebreaker:

Group 9

Group 10

Group 11

Group 12

Group 13

Group 14

Group 15

Group 16

Promotion play-offs

Group 1

Group 2

Group 3

Group 4

Promotion/relegation Segunda División

Tiebreaker:

Promotion to Segunda: Eldense
Remain on Segunda:: Sestao, Logroñés & Castellón
Relegation to Tercera: Plus Ultra

Tercera División play-offs

First round

Second round

Tiebreaker:

Third round

Tiebreaker:

Promotion to Segunda: Avilés, Rayo Vallecano, Alicante & Pontanés

External links
RSSSF 
Futbolme 

Tercera División seasons
3
Spain